The victoria is an elegant style of doorless four-wheeled open carriage, drawn by one or two horses, based on the phaeton with the addition of a coachman's seat at the front, and with a retractable roof over the passenger bench.

Named for Queen Victoria, it was possibly based on a phaeton made for George IV. The type was made some time before 1844, but acquired the name victoria around 1870, after one was imported to England by Edward VII, then Prince of Wales, in 1869. Drawn by one or two horses, it became a fashionable style of carriage for ladies riding in the park.

The victoria has a low body with a forward-facing seat for two passengers under a retractable calash top and a raised driver's seat on an iron frame. In the panel-boot type of victoria, sometimes confusingly called a cabriolet, a box under the driver's seat provides storage, a "boot", and forms a dashboard. In a Grand Victoria, a collapsible backwards-facing seat behind the driver accommodates additional passengers; the Victoria-Hansom was a later form of hansom cab based on the victoria.

The Ford Crown Victoria takes its name from the carriage. It has been used as a generic term for light horse carriages in Mumbai.


Gallery

Victorias

Panel-boot victorias

See also 
 Steering undercarriage
 Types of horse-drawn carriages

References

External links

Carriages